Bogo Jan (20 February 1944 — 10 March 2018) was a Slovenian ice hockey player. He competed in the men's tournaments at the 1964 Winter Olympics, the 1968 Winter Olympics and the 1972 Winter Olympics.

References

1944 births
2018 deaths
Slovenian ice hockey forwards
Olympic ice hockey players of Yugoslavia
Ice hockey players at the 1964 Winter Olympics
Ice hockey players at the 1968 Winter Olympics
Ice hockey players at the 1972 Winter Olympics
Sportspeople from Jesenice, Jesenice
HK Acroni Jesenice players
Yugoslav ice hockey forwards
Yugoslav ice hockey defencemen
Slovenian ice hockey defencemen